Victim of the Brain is a 1988 film by Dutch director Piet Hoenderdos, loosely based on The Mind's I (1981), a compilation of texts and stories on the philosophy of mind and self, co-edited by Douglas Hofstadter and Daniel C. Dennett. The film weaves interviews with Hofstadter with adaptations of several works in the book: Dennett's Where am I?, The Soul of the Mark III Beast by Terrel Miedaner, and also the short story The Seventh Sally: How Trurl's Own Perfection Led to No Good from The Cyberiad by Stanisław Lem. The film was shown several times on television in the Netherlands in the late 1980s.

See also
 Brain in a vat, the topic of the story Where am I?
 Can a machine have a soul?, ideas related to The Soul of the Mark III Beast
 Matrix reality, a popular term for concepts in the story How Trurl's Own Perfection Led to No Good

External links
 

1988 films
Films based on works by Stanisław Lem
1980s English-language films